The Super League Show is the BBC's principal rugby league programme, shown on BBC One in the North of England on Monday evenings, repeated nationally on BBC Two on Tuesday lunchtimes and also on BBC iPlayer. The programme, produced by PDI Media at BBC Yorkshire's studios in Leeds, is presented by Tanya Arnold with match commentary from Dave Woods and Andy Giddings and analysis from a variety of studio guests from Super League.

Broadcasts
The programme is broadcast to the North West, Yorkshire & North Midlands, North East & Cumbria, and East Yorkshire and Lincolnshire regions on Monday nights at 11.45 p.m. Since 2008, it has been repeated nationally on BBC Two, originally overnight on Mondays, but currently on Tuesday lunchtimes at 1 p.m.

It can also be viewed over the internet or downloaded using the BBC iPlayer in the UK. End of season play-offs and World Club Challenge highlights are shown across the whole country in a highlights package.

Before being succeeded by Tanya Arnold, Harry Gration presented the programme from 1999 until the latter part of the 2011 season. For the 2012 season, the programme was moved from Sundays to its fixed Monday night timeslot.

According to Harry Gration, one of the programme's first pundits, ex-Great Britain captain Garry Schofield, was effectively removed from the show for being too controversial.

Awards
The Super League Show picked up the Royal Television Society Sports Awards for best Nations and Regions Sports Actuality Programme in May 2007. It followed this up by winning Best Sports Programme at the Royal Television Society North West awards evening in November 2007.

See also
BBC Sport 
Rugby League Raw

References

External links
 

1999 British television series debuts
BBC Television shows
Super League
Rugby league in the United Kingdom
Rugby league television shows
1990s British sports television series
2000s British sports television series
2010s British sports television series
2020s British sports television series